The Lekoni River is a river in Gabon. It passes through Akieni and Lekoni.

The Leconi river rises in the Batéké Plateau near the border with the Republic of Congo. It is a tributary of the Ogooue River.

Its own tributary is the Lekey River.

References 

 National Geographic.2003. African Adventure Atlas Pg 24,72. led by Sean Fraser
 Lerique Jacques.1983. Hydrographie-Hydrologie. in Geographie et Cartographie du Gabon, Atlas Illustré led by The Ministère de l'Education Nationale de la Republique Gabonaise. Pg 14–15. Paris, France: Edicef
 Perusset André. 1983. Oro-Hydrographie (Le Relief) in Geographie et Cartographie du Gabon, Atlas Illustré led by The Ministère de l'Education Nationale de la Republique Gabonaise. Pg 10–13. Paris, France: Edicef.

Rivers of Gabon